Symphony No. 13 in F major, K. 112, by Wolfgang Amadeus Mozart, was written in Milan during his second journey to Italy in the autumn of 1771. The symphony is in four movements, the second of which is scored for strings alone. The third movement minuet may have been written earlier, and then incorporated into the symphony—the autograph manuscript shows the minuet copied in Leopold's hand. Nicholas Kenyon describes Symphony No. 13 as the last in "conventional mode"—thereafter "we are in the beginnings of a different world."

Movements and instrumentation

The instrumentation is: strings, 2 oboes, 2 horns, bassoon, continuo.

Allegro, 
Andante, 
Menuetto — Trio, 
Molto allegro,

Performance details
Its probable first performance was at a concert given by Leopold and Wolfgang Mozart at the residence of Albert Michael von Mayr, on 22 or 23 November 1771. This concert may also have seen the premiere of Mozart's 12th symphony.

References

Sources
Dearling, Robert: The Music of Wolfgang Amadeus Mozart: The Symphonies Associated University Presses Ltd, London 1982 
Kenyon, Nicholas: The Pegasus Pocket Guide to Mozart Pegasus Books, New York 2006 
Zaslaw, Neal:Mozart's Symphonies: Context, Performance Practice, Reception OUP, Oxford 1991

External links

13
1771 compositions
Compositions in F major